Aaron Sterling (born July 9, 1980) is an American drummer, producer, engineer, and session musician who lives in Los Angeles. The son of professional musicians, Sterling grew up in Texas and Nashville, Tennessee, before moving to L.A. in 2000. Known for his studio work, Sterling has played on hundreds of records over the past decade and has drummed for John Mayer since 2011, and has recorded for artists such as Taylor Swift, Sara Bareilles, the Civil Wars, Maren Morris and many, many more.

Sterling was the drummer on Mayer's Born and Raised, Paradise Valley, and Sob Rock albums and played in the band for Mayer's 2013–2014 World Tour, as well as the John Mayer 2019 and 2022 world tours  Sterling also appeared in the music videos for "Queen of California", Carry Me Away, and Last Train Home.

Equipment
Sterling plays a mix of Sugar Percussion and various vintage drums, Istanbul Agop Cymbals, Pro-mark Drumsticks and Evans Drumheads.

Discography

2000s

2010s

2020s

References

External links 

 

1980 births
Living people
Musicians from Dallas
21st-century American drummers